Two theorems in the mathematical field of Riemannian geometry bear the name Myers–Steenrod theorem, both from a 1939 paper by Myers and Steenrod.  The first states that every distance-preserving map (that is, an isometry of metric spaces) between two connected Riemannian manifolds is a smooth isometry of Riemannian manifolds.  A simpler proof was subsequently given by Richard Palais in 1957.  The main difficulty lies in showing that a distance-preserving map, which is a priori only continuous, is actually differentiable.

The second theorem, which is much more difficult to prove, states that the isometry group of a Riemannian manifold is a Lie group.  For instance, the group of isometries of the two-dimensional unit sphere is the orthogonal group O(3).

References

 
 

Differential geometry
Theorems in Riemannian geometry